Gandharva Mahavidyalaya New Delhi is an institution established in 1939 to popularize Indian classical music and dance. The Mahavidyalaya (school) came into being to perpetuate the memory of Pandit Vishnu Digambar Paluskar, the great reviver of Hindustani classical music, and to keep up the ideals set down by him. The first Gandharva Mahavidyalaya was established by him on 5 May 1901 at Lahore. The New Delhi school follows the syllabi set by the Akhil Bharatiya Gandharva Mahavidyalaya Mandal.

History
Gandharva Mahavidyalaya, New Delhi was established in 1939 by Pandit Vinay Chandra Maudgalya, disciple of Pandit Vinayakrao Patwardhan, an exponent from Gwalior Gharana. Today it is the oldest music school in Delhi and is headed by his son and a noted Hindustani classical singer, Pandit Madhup Mudgal.

Courses
The institution imparts theoretical and practical training in the following branches of music and dance:
 Hindustani Music: Vocal
 Hindustani Music Instrumental: Sitar, Bansuri (Lateral bamboo flute), Tabla, Harmonium and Violin
 Indian Classical Dance: Kathak, Bharatanatyam and Odissi

The courses of study followed by the Mahavidyalaya are those approved by the Akhil Bharatiya Gandharva Mahavidyalaya Mandal. It has nearly 1200 affiliated institutions and 800 Exam Centers across India. In 2007, the number of students enrolled exceeded 100,000.

Branches
Gandharva Mahavidyalaya, New Delhi was established in 1939 by Padma Shri Pt. Vinay Chandra Maudgalya from the Gwalior gharana and his younger brother Pt. Vipinchandra Maudgalya. They were assisted by their younger brother Sh. Pramod Mudgal who is member of the Akhil Bhartiya Gandharva Mahavidyalaya advisory board. It was Initially established in Prem House, Connaught Place, New Delhi and also branched out in old Delhi at Kamla Nagar near Delhi University. This was headed by Pt. Vipin Chandra Maudgalya, and was functioning as Delhi branch of Gandharva Mahavidyalaya till 2003. In 1972 The new building in Deen dayal Upadhyaya Marg was established and it now headed by Pt. Vinay Chandra Maudgalaya's son Pt. Madhup Mudgal since 1995. It has over 1,200 students and a faculty of 60 teachers. The Kamla Nagar branch now runs as an independent Institution called 'Chaturang Sangeet Sansthan' Affiliated to Akhil Bharatiya Gandharva Mahavidyalaya Mandal and it's been run forward by Sh. Anupam Mudgal and smt. Indu Mudgal. Gandharva Mahavidyalaya has also been organizing the annual "Vishnu Digamber Festival" in Delhi, for many years now. There is no branch of Gandharva Mahavidyalaya, New Delhi elsewhere in Delhi. It is affiliated to Akhil Bhartiya Gandharva Mahavidyalaya, Miraj.

The Mahavidyalaya is guided by a Music Advisory Board composed of top ranking learned and veteran musicians of India.

Admission

The following Certificates / Diplomas of ABGMM are awarded to the successful students:
 Sangeet Praveshika (2 years course) i.e., equivalent to matriculation
i.e., equivalent to senior secondary
 Sangeet Madhyama (2 years course) i.e., equivalent to Diploma
 Sangeet Visharad (3 years course) i.e., equivalent to Degree (Bachelor of Music)
 Sangeet Alankar (2 years course) i.e., equivalent to M.A. (Masters of Music)

Admission to Gandharva Mahavidyalaya is open to persons of all ages, castes, creeds and religions. Male and female students are trained separately.

There is one session in a year - in July.  Applicants are required to undergo a Music Syllabus preliminary test. Only those who clear this test are granted admission.

Syllabus 
Official Music Syllabus is available at Gandharva Mandal Website Information Page 

1. Prarambhik (elementary): Pre-matric. Knowledge of Shudha Swaras, Vadi, Samvadi, Audav-Shadav and one Chhota Khayal in each raga of the first year course.

2. Praveshika (first year): Knowledge of Shudha and Vikrit Swaras, Alankar, Nad, Saptak, Mela, Raga, Jati, Alap, Tan and Pakar.

Ragas: asavari (shuddha rishabh), Bibhas, Vridavani Sarang, Bhimpalas, Durga, Des

3. Praveshika (second year): Matric Music Knowledge of Alankars of more than four swaras including Vikrit Swara.

Additional Ragas: Alhaiya Bilawal, Kedar, Bihag, Bhairav, Malkauns, Bageshri, Khamaj

Tala: Ektal Vilambit, Chautal, Dhamar, Rupak, Dugun of all Tals. Knowledge of systems of Hindustani and Carnatic music; specialities of Nad, Varna, Swaralipi of Vishnu Digambar and Bhatkhande paddhati.

Definitions: Khayal, Dhrupad, Dhamar, Tappa, Thumri, Bhajan, Ghazal, Shruti, Janak and Janya Raga, Grah Ansha, Nyas, Meend, Kana Swara, Poorvang, Uttarang, Sankeerna Ragas, Gat, Tora, Sparsh, Krintan, Mizrab. 
Biography of Pt. Vishnu Digambar Paluskar.

4. Madhyama (Third year): Tuning of Tanpura, Division of 22 Shrutis in seven Swaras.

Madhya Laya Khayals with improvisations in Jaunpuri, Malkauns, Hamir, Patdeep, Tilang, Deshkar, and Kalingda, Vilambit and Drut Khayals with improvisations in Bhupali, Yaman (Kalyan) Bageshri and Bihag.

Tala: Jhumra, Sul, Tilwada and Deepchandi; detailed knowledge of Laya; practical knowledge of Meend, Sut, Ghasit, Murki. Tanas: Saral, Kut, Mishra, Sapat, Zamzama, Gamak, Uthav, Chalan, Nad and Shruti; writing Dugun and Chaugun of Dhrupad and Dhamar; detailed knowledge of Swaralipi of Vishnu Digambar and Bhatkhande paddhati.

5. Madhyama (Fourth year): Madhyam Laya Khayals with improvisations in Chhayanat, Kamod, Gaud Sarang, Jaijaoiwanti, Pooriya dhanashree, Shankara; Vilambit and Drut Khayals with improvisations in Alhaiya Bilawal, Bhairav, Bhimpalasi, Brindavani Sarang and Kedar, appropriate knowledge of Dhvani, Kampan, Andolan; comparison between Hindustani and Karnatak systems of music; Guna (merits) and Dosha (demerits) in a musician. Definition of Alpatva, Bahutva, Avirbhav, Tirobhav, Prabandh, Chaturang and Trivat; Anulom, Vilom, Veend, Zamzama, Chikari, Jhala, Dillibaaj, Poorabbaaj and knowledge of Vyankatamakhis 80 melakartas.

6. Visharad (Fifth year):

Madhya Laya Khayals with improvisations

Vilambit and Drut Khayals with improvisations in ragas Todi, shudha sarang, multani, yaman, bihag, puriadhanashri, rageshri, jog, shankara knowledge of singing from written Swaralipi; knowledge of Ada 
Chautal, Adha, Punjabi Dhumali, Chacher and Sul.

Dhrupad-Dhamar in Dugun, Tigun, Chaugun and Chhagun.

Chhagun and Athgun Tana with Jod, Alap Jhala, Maseetkhani knowGat.

Styles of Alap; detailed description of varieties of Tanas; Vidari, Ragalakashan, Jatigayan, Vinyas, Apanyas, Gayaki, Nayaki, Ladant. Writing in Swaralipi (notation); Classification of Ragas; Biographies of ancient musicians.

7. Visharad (Sixth year) 

Madhya Laya Khayals with improvisations in and Vilambit and Drut Khayals with improvisations in Bhairav, Komalrishabha Asawari, Deshkar, Madhamad Sarang, Puria kalyan, Hamir, Bhupali, Kalavati, Gorakh Kalyan, Bahar. Detailed knowledge of these Ragas and also of Dhrupad, Dhamar, Maseetkhani and Razakhani Gat, Trivat, Chaturang; Vilambit and Drut Khayal, Thumri, Pad Kavita; knowledge of different kinds of Layakaris of the talas: Matta, Sawari, Brahma, Laxmi, Rudra; appropriate knowledge of the divisions of Shruti-Swar as in ancient, medieval and modern times; comparison of Hindustani and Karnatak tala systems. Knowledge of Gram, Moorchhana, Kalawant, Pandit, Vaggeyakar, Khandarbani Nauharbani, etc. Varieties of Gamak, Rag-ragini paddhati, That paddhati and Raga paddhati. Biographies of Jaidev, Gopal Nayak, Khusro, Tansen, Swami Haridas, Baiju, Sadarang, Bhaskarbua, Vazhebua, Alladiya Khan, Balkrishnabua, Maseet Khan, Faiyaz Khan and Inayat Khan. Knowledge of Staff Notation; history of the instrument, importance of Jhankar in instrument; 
necessity of Tarab; application of Chikari.

8. Visharad Tritiya (as per syllabus changes in April/May 2013)- ragas are Lalit, Bilaskhani Todi, Jaunpuri, Marubihag, Nand, Miyanmalhar, Hansdhwahni, Darabari, Basant, Tilakkamod.

9. Sangeet Alankar (Seventh & Eighth year): M. Music 

Any one of the following three to be taken:

(a) Performance and Music Composition

(b) Practical Music

(c) Science and History of Music

Details are at Pathyakram-Nayamavali of the Akhil Bharatiya Gandharva Mahavidyalaya Mandal (Mumbai), Gandharva Niketan Brahman Puri, Miraj 416410 (Maharashtra).

For details of courses of study and examinations in instrumental Music and Dance you may refer to the prospectus and syllabus of All India Gandharva Mahavidyalaya Mandal, Mumbai 
Gandharva Mahavidyalaya has some Bharatnatyam exams.

See also
 Eastern fare music foundation
 Delhi University

References

External links 
 Akhil Bharatiya Gandharva Mahavidyalaya Mandal, Mumbai, website]
 Gandharva Mahavidyalaya, New Delhi, website
 http://gandharvapune.com/

Music schools in India
Education in Maharashtra
Hindustani music organisations
Dance schools in India
Educational institutions established in 1939
Education in Delhi
1939 establishments in India